John Aubrey Clarendon Latham, (23 February 1921 – 1 January 2006) was a Northern Rhodesian-born British conceptual artist.

Life and work

Latham was born in Northern Rhodesia to the cricketer and colonial administrator Geoffrey Latham. He was educated in England at Winchester College. In the Second World War he commanded a motor torpedo boat in the Royal Naval Volunteer Reserve. After the war he studied art, first at the Regent Street Polytechnic and then at the Chelsea College of Art and Design. He married fellow artist and collaborator Barbara Steveni in Westminster in 1951.

The spray can became Latham's primary medium, as can be seen in Man Caught Up with a Yellow Object (oil painting, 1954) in the Tate Gallery collection. In addition to spray paint, Latham tore, sawed, chewed and burnt books to create collage material for his work, such as Film Star (1960).

Latham's event-based art was influential in performance art. In 1966, he took part in the Destruction in Art Symposium in London led by Gustav Metzger along with Fluxus artists such as Yoko Ono, Wolf Vostell and Al Hansen.

His "skoob" ("books" written backwards) works using books or materials derived from them had the power to shock. He moved from collages to towers of books which he then burnt, awakening uncomfortable echoes of the Nazi regime's public burning of banned books.

From 1983 Latham lived and worked at his house, Flat Time House in Peckham. 
In 1991 he produced God is Great (no. 2), a conceptual artwork featuring copies of the Bible, Quran, and a volume of the Talmud, each cut in two and attached to a sheet of glass. In 2005 Tate Britain held an exhibition of Latham's work.

Latham died at Kings College Hospital, Camberwell, on 1 January 2006.

In 2010 John Latham: Canvas Events was published by Ridinghouse.

In 2016 the Henry Moore Institute presented A Lesson in Sculpture with John Latham, an exhibition addressing Latham's visionary contribution to the study of sculpture, bringing sixteen works by Latham, spanning 1958 to 2005, into conversation with sixteen sculptures by artists working across the twentieth and twenty-first centuries.

Like Latham, members of the rock band Pink Floyd attended Regent Street Polytechnic. In 2016 Pink Floyd released their collection of rare and unreleased recorded early material in the box set The Early Years 1965–1972. On the second CD of the collection is an extended instrumental improvisation, similar to that of the middle section of their performances of "Interstellar Overdrive", which were recorded in 1967 as a soundtrack for Latham's 1962 film Speak. The piece is split across nine tracks on the CD.

In 2017, Latham's work featured in the main exhibition of the 57th Venice Biennale, Viva Arte Viva.

References

Sources
 Hamilton, R. (1986) John Latham. In: Lisson Gallery (1987) John Latham: Early Works. London: Lisson Gallery.

Further reading
 Allan, Kenneth R. "Business Interests, 1969-72: N.E. Thing Co. Ltd., Les Levine, Bernar Venet, and John Latham" in Parachute 106 (April–June, 2002): 106–122.
 Latham, J. (1984) Report of a Surveyor. London; Stuttgart: Edition Hansjörg Mayer.

External links
John Latham's Flat Time House
John Latham's Online Archive Project (Ligatus, University of the Arts London)
Tate Britain's 'John Latham in Focus' exhibition website
Lisson Gallery
Latham's website and discussion of flat-time – 
The Least Event The Future of Flat Time HO -  The Least Event, Camberwell Arts Week (24 and 25 June - 11am - 6pm)
'Portrait with Word' of John Latham by Mark-Steffen Goewecke

1921 births
2006 deaths
British conceptual artists
Alumni of Chelsea College of Arts
South African artists
English contemporary artists
Zambian artists
British expatriates in Zambia